A kukkuma (Hausa: kukuma) is a small fiddle (about cm long) used in Hausa music. A spike fiddle or spike lute, the instrument is made from a calabash gourd covered with skin, with the neck (a stick) that impales the gourd, the bottom poking out one side to form a spike. It is strung with horsehair and played with a horsehair bow.

It was popularized by Ibrahim Na Habu. It is associated with light secular dance and praise music and in performance can be played alone, or is paired with the kalangu talking drum or calabash in a simple ensemble.

The larger more esteemed fiddle, the goge, is used for rituals associated with cult and pre-Islamic Bori rituals, although it can also be played in secular music too.

References

Hausa music
Nigerien musical instruments
Violins